The Solidarity Action Movement (MAS) was a conservative political party in Guatemala founded in 1986 and dissolved in 1996.

References

Conservative parties in Guatemala
Defunct political parties in Guatemala
Political parties established in 1986
Political parties disestablished in 1996
Protestantism in Guatemala
Protestant political parties